The cast of the television series MythBusters perform experiments to verify or debunk urban legends, old wives' tales, and the like. This is a list of the various myths tested on the show as well as the results of the experiments (the myth is either busted, plausible, or confirmed). The 2018 season premiered on January 3, in a Wednesday time slot, and is the last season of the show to date, with Adam Savage returning the following year in MythBusters Jr.

Episode overview

Episode 255 – "Fire Arrow vs. Gas Tank"
 Original air date: January 3, 2018

Episode 256 – "Pane in the Glass"
 Original air date: January 10, 2018

Episode 257 – "Wild Wild West"
 Original air date: January 17, 2018

Episode 258 – "Spike in the Road"
 Original air date: January 24, 2018

Episode 259 – "Dynamite Deposit"
 Original air date: January 31, 2018

Episode 260 – "Backseat Getaway Driver"
 Original air date: February 7, 2018

Episode 261 – "Electrified Escape"
 Original US air date: Unaired
 Original UK air date: February 21, 2018

Episode 262 – "Dropping a Bomb"
 Original US air date: Unaired
 Original UK air date: February 28, 2018

References

General references

External links

 
 Discovery website
 

2018
2018 American television seasons